Lee Dainton (born 22 August 1973) is a Welsh stunt performer, skateboarder, and filmmaker best known as the star and co-creator of MTV UK's Dirty Sanchez.

Career

Early life 
Dainton is a native of Pontypool, Wales. He attended Abersychan School and West Monmouth School. He studied carpentry at Pontypool College. He started skateboarding at the age of 12. He first met Mathew Pritchard in Cardiff in 1990. He later met Michael "Pancho" Locke, and Dan Joyce by participating in various skateboarding competitions. He worked as a carpenter with Torfaen council before he left the job and bought a video camera to film the four skateboarding, doing stunts and practical jokes for 18 months. He then made a DVD out of the footage titled Pritchard vs Dainton, which was released in 2001. During, and a little after the first season of Dirty Sanchez, he worked for a skate store.

Dirty Sanchez 
When Dirty Sanchez first aired in 2003, it became clear that Dainton is the one who always messes with his friends, mainly with Pancho and Pritchard. The rivalry between Dainton and Pritchard got worse as the series went on. He is usually the one who performs stunts with piercings, most notably slamming his forehead on a lot of thumbtacks, and performing body suspension. He and Pritchard hosted the first Dirty Sanchez spin-off titled Wrecked in 2007. In 2008, they both starred in another spin-off titled Sanchez Get High.

Personal life 
Dainton proposed to his girlfriend Amy in 2017 after 22 years of dating. They got married in 2018 and have two daughters together. He now has his own skate store named Kill City.

Filmography

Film

Television

Web series

Music videos

References

External links

1973 births
Living people
Welsh skateboarders
British stunt performers
Welsh television presenters